= Sarany Protected Area =

Protected area of North Khorasan in northern Iran

Coordinates: 37°44′52″N 58°6′47″E

Sarany Protected Area is a protected area of North Khorasan in northern Iran on the Turkmenistan border. It became protected in 1982. It lies about 40 kilometres south-west of Ashgabat.
